The Global Governance Group (3G) is an informal group of smaller and medium-sized countries with the aim of providing greater representation to its member countries and collectively channeling their views into the G20 process more effectively.

The group was founded by Singapore in 2009 and consists of 30 member countries, the current president of the UN General Assembly, the current president of the G20, two previous presidents of G20.

The Chair of 3G is rotated among member states.

Member states

 ASIA (9 countries):
 
 
 
 
 
 
 
 
 

 EUROPE (8 countries):
 
 
 
 
 
 
 
 

 NORTH AMERICA (6 countries):
 
 
 
 
 
 

 AFRICA (3 countries):
 
 
 

 SOUTH AMERICA (3 countries):
 
 
 

 OCEANIA (1 country):

See also
 List of country groupings

References

Intergovernmental organizations